The 2022 Ohio general elections took place on November 8, 2022, throughout the US state of Ohio.

Federal

Senate 

Incumbent Republican Senator Rob Portman announced he was retiring.

Republican and Democratic primaries were held on May 3, 2022. U.S. Senate 2022 candidates elected during the primary were Congressman Tim Ryan (D) and J.D. Vance (R). In the general election, Republican J.D. Vance won the open seat defeating Democratic U.S. Representative Tim Ryan.

House of Representatives 

All of Ohio's 15 seats in the United States House of Representatives were up for election in 2022.

Governor and Lieutenant Governor 

Incumbent Republican Governor Mike DeWine and Lieutenant Governor Jon Husted were reelected to a second term defeating Democratic Governor candidate Nan Whaley and Lieutenant Governor candidate Cheryl Stephens.

Attorney General 

Incumbent Republican Attorney General Dave Yost was re-elected to a second term defeating Democrat Ohio Representative Jeff Crossman.

Secretary of State 

Ohio Secretary of State Frank LaRose was re-elected to a second term defeating Democrat Chelsea Clark.

Treasurer 

Incumbent Republican State Treasurer Robert Sprague ran for re-election to a second term in office and was challenged by Democrat Scott Schertzer. Sprague easily won the general election.

Republican primary

Candidates

Declared 
 Robert Sprague, incumbent State Treasurer

Endorsements

Results

Democratic primary

Candidates

Declared 
 Scott Schertzer, Mayor of Marion and candidate for Lieutenant Governor in 2018

Results

General election

Results

Auditor 

Incumbent Republican State Auditor Keith Faber easily won re-election.

Republican primary

Candidates

Declared 
 Keith Faber, incumbent State Auditor

Endorsements

Results

Democratic primary

Candidates

Declared 
 Taylor Sappington, Nelsonville city auditor

Results

General election

Results

General Assembly

Senate 

The 17 odd-numbered districts out of 33 seats in the Ohio Senate were up for election in 2022. Prior to the election, ten of these seats were held by Republicans and seven were held by Democrats.

House of Representatives 

All 99 seats in the Ohio House of Representatives were up for election in 2022. Prior to the election, sixty-four of these seats were held by Republicans and thirty-five were held by Democrats.

Supreme Court 

Although Supreme Court elections were nonpartisan in the past, the Ohio General Assembly passed a bill in June 2021 to make Ohio Supreme Court and Ohio Court of Appeals elections display the party label on the candidates.

Chief Justice

Republican primary

Candidates

Declared 
 Sharon L. Kennedy, incumbent Associate Justice of the Supreme Court of Ohio (2012–present)

Withdrew
 Pat DeWine, incumbent Associate Justice of the Supreme Court of Ohio (2017–present) (running for re-election)

Declined 
 Maureen O'Connor, incumbent Chief Justice of the Supreme Court of Ohio (2011–present) (retiring due to age limit)

Endorsements

Results

Democratic primary

Candidates

Declared 
 Jennifer Brunner, incumbent Associate Justice of the Supreme Court of Ohio (2021–present)

Endorsements

Results

General election

Polling

Results

Associate Justice (Term commencing 01/01/2023)

Republican primary

Candidates

Declared 
 Patrick F. Fischer, incumbent Associate Justice of the Supreme Court of Ohio (2017–present)

Endorsements

Results

Democratic primary

Candidates

Declared 
 Terri Jamison, incumbent Judge of the Ohio Court of Appeals for the 10th District (2021–present)

Endorsements

Results

General election

Polling

Results

Associate Justice (Term commencing 01/02/2023)

Republican primary

Candidates

Declared 
 Pat DeWine, incumbent Associate Justice of the Supreme Court of Ohio (2017–present)

Endorsements

Results

Democratic primary

Candidates

Declared 
 Marilyn Zayas, incumbent Judge of the Ohio Court of Appeals for the 1st District

Endorsements

Results

General election

Polling

Results

Notes

References

External links 
Official campaign websites for treasurer candidates
 Robert Sprague (R) for Treasurer

Official campaign websites for auditor candidates
 Keith Faber (R) for Auditor
 Taylor Sappington (D) for Auditor

Official campaign websites for chief justice candidates
 Jennifer Brunner (D) for Chief Justice
 Sharon Kennedy (R) for Chief Justice

Official campaign websites for supreme court candidates
 Pat DeWine (R) for Supreme Court
 Pat Fischer (R) for Supreme Court
 Terri Jamison (D) for Supreme Court
 Marilyn Zayas (D) for Supreme Court

 
Ohio